Poa angustifolia is a species of flowering plant belonging to the family Poaceae.

Its native range is Azores, Morocco and temperate Eurasia.

References

angustifolia
Flora of Europe
Flora of temperate Asia
Flora of the Azores
Flora of Morocco